John Willis "Red" Brodnax Jr. (March 6, 1936 – January 6, 2006) was an American football player. Brodnax played college football  for the LSU Tigers and played professionally for both the Pittsburgh Steelers of the National Football League (NFL) and Denver Broncos of the American Football League (AFL).

Brodnax was a member of coach Paul Dietzel's 1958 national championship team. He was the starting fullback on the "White Team" of Dietzel's three-platoon system, in the backfield with Warren Rabb and Billy Cannon. Brodnax was awarded the Jacobs Blocking Trophy as the best blocker in the Southeastern Conference. He was also awarded the Nils V. "Swede" Nelson Award for "the strength of his unselfish sacrifice of personal achievement to aid his team to an unbeaten record and a Sugar Bowl berth against Clemson."

Brodnax's lone score as a professional was a short touchdown reception from quarterback Frank Tripucka with the Broncos in 1960 against the Buffalo Bills.

References

External links
College stats

American football fullbacks
LSU Tigers football players
Players of American football from Louisiana
1936 births
2006 deaths
Denver Broncos (AFL) players
Pittsburgh Steelers players
People from Bastrop, Louisiana